Mohamed "Momo" Dahmane (born April 9, 1982, in Maubeuge) is a retired footballer. Born in France, he represented Algeria at youth level. He is currently a director of sports at Olympic Charleroi.

Career
Mons signed Dahmane in January 2006 from the Belgian Third Division. He helped the club win the Belgian Second Division in the summer of 2006.

On January 30, 2009, Dahmane joined Club Brugge from Mons on a two and a half year deal running until 2011, with the club paying a €500,000 transfer fee.

On September 1, 2010, he signed a one-year contract with Turkish club Bucaspor. However, on January 4, 2011, he reached a mutual agreement with the club to terminate his contract.

After returning to the Belgian lower level he became a member of the technical staff at UR La Louvière Centre. In 2020 he moved to Olympic Charleroi.

References

External links

1982 births
Living people
People from Maubeuge
Sportspeople from Nord (French department)
Footballers from Hauts-de-France
Algerian footballers
French footballers
French sportspeople of Algerian descent
Algeria under-23 international footballers
Association football forwards

Stade Poitevin FC players
Entente Feignies Aulnoye FC players
R.F.C. Seraing (1922) players
R.A.E.C. Mons players
K.R.C. Genk players
RC Lens players
Club Brugge KV players
K.A.S. Eupen players
Bucaspor footballers
CS Constantine players
CR Belouizdad players
UR La Louvière Centre players
R. Olympic Charleroi Châtelet Farciennes players

Championnat National 2 players
Belgian Pro League players
Challenger Pro League players
Süper Lig players
TFF First League players
Algerian Ligue Professionnelle 1 players
Belgian Third Division players

Algerian expatriate footballers
French expatriate footballers
Expatriate footballers in Belgium
Expatriate footballers in Turkey
French expatriate sportspeople in Belgium
French expatriate sportspeople in Turkey
Algerian expatriate sportspeople in Belgium
Algerian expatriate sportspeople in Turkey